Woodbine is a city in, and the county seat of, Camden County, Georgia, United States, an original county established when the state constitution was adopted in 1777. The population was 1,412 at the 2010 census.

The East Coast Greenway, a 3,000 mile long system of trails connecting Maine to Florida, runs along the Woodbine Riverwalk. Spaceport Camden is being developed adjacent to the city.

History
They were granted the land named Pile's Bluff, which historians believe to be near Woodbine.

A tract of land was granted to Anton Cunning by the state in 1808. It became known as the Woodbine Plantation. Luke John Bailey purchased it in 1835 and held it through the Civil War, during which the house was burned by Union troops. James King Bedell acquired the property, constructed a new house, and restored the plantation. The railroad entered Camden County in 1893, and Bedell sold a right-of-way across his land, but required that the first rail community be named "Woodbine".

Woodbine was incorporated as a town on August 13, 1908, and the word is the common English name for the honeysuckle, Lonicera. The town grew more after the Atlantic Coastal Highway was constructed during 1927 and the county seat relocated there the following year. Woodbine re-incorporated as a city in 1953.

On the morning of February 3, 1971 the Thiokol Chemical Corporation, a factory that made flares for soldiers fighting in Vietnam, exploded. Twenty-eight employees of the factory, predominantly Black women, were killed after a flame in a small building, according to court records, triggered a massive explosion. The blast blew pieces of the building almost a mile away, left more than 50 other people injured.

Geography
The city is situated near the center of the county, which is located in the southeast corner of the state near the Florida border. It is located on the south bank of the Satilla River near the head of its tidal extent. U.S. Route 17 (Ocean Highway) passes through the center of the city, leading northeast  to Brunswick and south  to Kingsland.

Woodbine is located at  (30.961869, -81.720017).

Demographics

2020 census

As of the 2020 United States census, there were 1,062 people, 467 households, and 316 families residing in the city.

2000 census
As of the census of 2000, there were 1,218 people, 423 households, and 299 families residing in the city. The racial makeup of the city was 53.61% White, 43.84% African American, 0.33% Native American, 0.25% Asian, 0.90% from other races, and 1.07% from two or more races. Hispanic or Latino of any race were 2.30% of the population.

There were 423 households, out of which 37.8% had children under the age of 18 living with them, 45.2% were married couples living together, 20.8% had a female householder with no husband present, and 29.1% were non-families. 24.3% of all households were made up of individuals, and 9.2% had someone living alone who was 65 years of age or older.  The average household size was 2.66 and the average family size was 3.18.

In the city, the population was spread out, with 30.0% under the age of 18, 10.1% from 18 to 24, 29.8% from 25 to 44, 20.5% from 45 to 64, and 9.5% who were 65 years of age or older.  The median age was 33 years. For every 100 females, there were 98.0 males.  For every 100 females age 18 and over, there were 100.9 males.

The median income for a household in the city was $34,632, and the median income for a family was $39,688. Males had a median income of $30,192 versus $22,273 for females. The per capita income for the city was $13,709.  About 15.5% of families and 18.7% of the population were below the poverty line, including 18.9% of those under age 18 and 22.1% of those age 65 or over.

Climate

See also
 Woodbine Historic District (Woodbine, Georgia)

References

External links
 
 City of Woodbine official website
 Woodbine at City-Data.com

Cities in Georgia (U.S. state)
Cities in Camden County, Georgia
County seats in Georgia (U.S. state)